Dehigama is a village in Sri Lanka. It is located within Kandy District, Central Province.

Demographics

See also
List of towns in Central Province, Sri Lanka

References

External links

Populated places in Kandy District